Olav Rasmussen Langeland (14 March 1904 – 18 December 1981) was a Norwegian politician for the Centre Party.

He was born in Vikør. His father was Rasmus Olsen Langeland, Member of Parliament and Minister of Labour 1931–1933.

He was elected to the Norwegian Parliament from Møre og Romsdal in 1954, and was re-elected on three occasions.

Langeland was a member of Borgund municipality council in the period 1951–1955.

References

1904 births
1981 deaths
Members of the Storting
Centre Party (Norway) politicians
20th-century Norwegian politicians